The Seminole County Courthouse is a two-story red brick courthouse building whose original, central portion was built in 1927.  It was expanded in 1939 in a Works Progress Administration project, and other renovation was done in the 1970s, compatibly with the original design.  It was listed on the National Register of Historic Places in 1984.

References

Courthouses on the National Register of Historic Places in Oklahoma
Government buildings completed in 1927
Buildings and structures in Seminole County, Oklahoma
County courthouses in Oklahoma
National Register of Historic Places in Seminole County, Oklahoma